László Báthory de Császár ( – 27 February 1456) was a Pauline monk and the first translator of the Bible into Hungarian.

Background 

Báthory (also Báthori or Bátori) was born around 1420 in Nyírcsászári. Little is known of his early life. It is possible he belonged to the aristocratic Báthory family. He completed his university studies in Italy and France. After returning to Hungary, he took part in John Hunyadi's campaign against the Ottomans. He grew disillusioned with the court of Ladislaus V and entered monastic life with the Pauline order.

He then dedicated his life to the theology, translating the Bible into Hungarian, and writing hagiographies of the lives of many saints. He lived as a hermit there from 1437 to 1457. During this time he translated the Bible from Latin. Eventually he returned to the Monastery of St Lawrence at Buda, where he died. His work was also found among the Bibliotheca Corviniana of Matthias Corvinus, but was lost during the Ottoman rule of Hungary. He was still attending mass on the day of his death. He was buried in the church of the monastery, in front of the altar of St Stephen.

The first versions of the Hungarian Bible translations were made during the 15th century, but no contemporary copies have survived. However, the 16th century  is most likely a copy of Báthory's work in the 15th century. The 18th century portrait of Báthory, believed to have been painted by a Pauline monk from Szentlőrinc in 1456, is preserved in the Hungarian National Museum.

Legacy 
The cave he used as a hermitage was opened in 1911 as Bathory Cave. A black marble slab commemorating his work was placed outside the cave, a small wooden house was built in front of the entrance, and in 1931 a marble altar was designed by Imre Havran. Today, only the broken pieces of the marble slab remain. The cave is closed and can only be visited with an escort.

Poet Sándor Reményik wrote a poem in front of the Bathory Cave.

The László Báthory Scout team #442, in District XII of Budapest was named in his honor.

References

Further reading

External links 
 Blessed Császáry (Báthori) László Pauline Bible translator, who was born in the village.
 Bathory Cave, geocaching.hu

Pauline monks
Hungarian beatified people
Laszlo
Translators of the Bible into Hungarian
1420 births
1456 deaths
15th-century Hungarian people
Hungarian hermits
Hungarian translators